Gryllus brevicaudus, the short-tailed field cricket, is a species of cricket in the subfamily Gryllinae.. It is found in North America.

References

brevicaudus
Articles created by Qbugbot
Insects described in 1980